Carters Building Supplies is a New Zealand chain of building supplies stores. It has 49 locations, including 12 in Auckland.

The first Carters store opened in 1859 in Napier Central.

There were 34 Carters stores in 1999. There were 37 Carters stores in 2003.

References

External links
 Official website

Home improvement companies of New Zealand
New Zealand companies established in 1859
Retail companies established in 1859